Valentina Tirozzi (born 26 March 1986)  is an Italian professional volleyball player. She plays for Italy women's national volleyball team. She participated in the 2015 Women's European Volleyball Championship.

Career
Valentina Tirozzi's career began in 2000 when he joined the team of Ester Volleyball of Naples, in Serie B2: with the capital club Campania remained for three years also disputing a championship of Series C . 
In the 2003-04 season she transferred to Volley Vicenza, participating in the B2 championship  Series; The following season was promoted to the first team, making her debut in the Italian top league.

In mid-season 2005-06, she was transferred to Volleyball Villanterio Pavia, in Serie A2, while in the next season passes to Florens Volley Castellana Grotte, always in junior league. 
In the 2007-08 season, she went back to Vicenza, initially in the team which played in the B1 series, then in mid-year in the A1 Series.

In the 2009-10 season, she was hired by Giannino Pieralisi Volley of Jesi; then she joined the River Volley of Piacenza.

In the 2011-12 season, she passes to Robur Tiboni Volley Urbino, while the following season played for Robursport Volley Pesaro.
In 2013, she got her first call-up to the National team.

For the 2013-14 season, she played for Imoco Volley of Conegliano, while in next year she moved to the Volleyball Casalmaggiore, the club with which she remains for three seasons, and won her first trophy, namely the Scudetto, and was also honored as MVP the final set, and then the Italian Super Cup in 2015, and the Champions League 2015-16.

In the 2017-18 season, she plays for Azzurra Volley San Casciano, again in Serie A1.

References

External links
http://www.legavolleyfemminile.it/?page_id=194&idat=TIR-VAL-86
Pomì - Bergamo 1-3 addio allo scudetto

1986 births
Italian women's volleyball players
Living people
People from Avellino
Sportspeople from the Province of Avellino